The 1884 South Carolina gubernatorial election was held on November 4, 1884 to select the governor of the state of South Carolina. Governor Hugh Smith Thompson was renominated by the Democrats and was reelected for a second two-year term.

Democratic Convention
Governor Hugh Smith Thompson had made no enemies during his first term as governor and no opposition to his nomination developed at the state Democratic convention of 1884. Thompson was then renominated by acclamation to be the Democratic nominee for governor in the general election, effectively meaning that he would serve two more years since there was no opposition in the general election.

General election
The general election was held on November 4, 1884 and Hugh Smith Thompson was elected as governor of South Carolina without opposition. Turnout was less than the previous gubernatorial election because of the lack of opposition in the general election.

 

|-
| 
| colspan=5 |Democratic hold
|-

See also
Governor of South Carolina
List of governors of South Carolina
South Carolina gubernatorial elections

References

"Election Returns." Reports and Resolutions of the General Assembly of the State of South Carolina. Volume II. Columbia, South Carolina: Charles A. Calvo, Jr., 1884, p. 782.

External links
SCIway Biography of Governor Hugh Smith Thompson

1884 United States gubernatorial elections
1884
Gubernatorial
November 1884 events